Flavio Bruno Pardini (Rome, 7 December 1989), known professionally as Gazzelle, is an Italian singer-songwriter. His stage name was chosen without any connection with Pardini's real personality, mainly because of the word's sound, and after Adidas Gazelle sneakers.

His debut single, "Quella te", was released by Maciste Dischi in late 2016. At the time, he refused to appear and to reveal any detail about himself. He later explained he wanted to preserve his privacy and to be one step back from his songs, in order to let people focus on his music. His real identity and image were released in March 2017, when he released his debut album, Superbattito, and embarked on his first concert tour.
One year later, the album was re-released under the title Megasuperbattito, also featuring the singles "Sayonara", "Stelle filanti" and "Martelli".

His second studio album, Punk (2018), was preceded by the singles "Tutta la vita", "Sopra" and "Scintille". In March 2018, he performed for the first time in indoor sports arenas Mediolanum Forum in Milan and PalaLottomatica in Rome. He also took part in the 2019 International Worker's Day concert in Piazza San Giovanni Laterano, Rome, annually supported by Italian trade unions CGIL, CISL and UIL.
A new edition of the album, Post Punk, was released in late 2019. It also included the singles "Polynesia", "Settembre" and "Una canzone che non so".
In order to promote the album, he embarked on an indoor tour in January and February 2020.

Discography

Albums

Singles

External links

References

1989 births
Living people
Singers from Rome
Italian pop singers
21st-century Italian male  singers